Cynthia Clopper is an American linguist and professor and chair of the linguistics department at Ohio State University. Clopper is known for her work on dialect perception. She currently serves as co-editor of the journal Language and Speech and is a member of the editorial board of the Journal of Phonetics. Clopper is currently the president of the Association for Laboratory Phonology

Education 
Clopper holds a BA in Linguistics and Russian from Duke University. She received her PhD in 2004 from Indiana University, with a dissertation titled Linguistic Experience and the Perceptual Classification of Dialect Variation.<ref></ref>

References 

Speech perception researchers
Indiana University alumni
Phoneticians
Duke University alumni
Ohio State University faculty
Year of birth missing (living people)
Living people
Linguists from the United States
Women linguists
Linguistics journal editors